Toccara is a given name. Notable people with the name include:

Toccara Jones (born 1981), American television personality, fashion model, occasional actress and singer
Toccara Montgomery (born 1982), American freestyle wrestler
Toccara Williams, American WNBA basketball player